Tridrepana septempunctata is a moth in the family Drepanidae. It was described by Warren in 1896. It is found in Assam in India and on Sumatra in Indonesia.

The wingspan is about 30.2-34.6 mm.

Subspecies
Tridrepana septempunctata septempunctata (India: Assam)
Tridrepana septempunctata nitidior Watson, 1957 (Sumatra)

References

Moths described in 1896
Drepaninae